The Spanish Socialist Workers' Party of Extremadura (PSOE–E) is the regional branch in Extremadura of the Spanish Socialist Workers' Party (PSOE), main centre-left party in Spain since the 1970s.

Electoral performance

Assembly of Extremadura

Cortes Generales

European Parliament

Notes

References

1988 establishments in Spain
Extremadura
Political parties established in 1988
Political parties in Extremadura
Social democratic parties in Spain